The № 3 New Zealand General Hospital was a World War I military hospital established in Codford, Wiltshire, England on the western rim of Salisbury Plain, taking over from a Royal Army Medical Corps hospital. It stood opposite the New Zealand Command Depôt, known as Codford Camp, and was a few miles from Sling Camp. The depôt accommodated 2,500 men and the proximity of Sling Camp meant that a hospital nearby was necessary. 

The hospital initially had around 300 beds but this was later expanded to 1000. Attached to the hospital was a venereal-disease (VD) section with 500 beds. The hospital extended to huts known as the № 11 Camp, where many of the VD patients were treated. The VD section was separated from the rest of the hospital by barbed wire to prevent general convalescent patients from associating with those who had VD.

Though completely equipped much like its sister hospitals, No. 1 New Zealand General Hospital and No. 2 New Zealand General Hospital, number three did not take convoys of wounded, so dealt with mostly non-serious cases, such as pneumonia.

Specific commemoration 
One of the original 49 bells at the National War Memorial Carillion is named for the Codford Hospital. The Codford bell was given by returned soldier James Finlay in memory of Garfield Warin and Nurse Kathleen Hollis who worked at the hospital. Finlay contracted pneumonia whilst training, and was sent to the hospital for treatment.

References 

Military units and formations of the New Zealand Army
Military hospitals in the United Kingdom
Army medical units and formations
Defunct hospitals in England
Hospitals established in 1916
Hospitals in Wiltshire